KRMQ-FM (101.5 FM, "Big 101.5") is a radio station broadcasting a classic rock format.  Licensed to Clovis, New Mexico, United States, the station serves the Clovis area.  The station is currently owned by Rooney Moon Broadcasting, Inc. and features programming from Westwood One.

History
On April 4, 2016 KRMQ changed their format from oldies (branded as "Q101.5") to rock-leaning classic hits, branded as "Big 101.5".

References

External links

RMQ-FM
Clovis, New Mexico